Sarah Elizabeth Lewis is an associate professor of History of Art and Architecture and African and African-American studies at Harvard University. Her research focuses on the intersection of African American and Black Atlantic visual representation, racial justice, and representational democracy in the United States from the nineteenth century through the present.

Education
Lewis attended the Brearley School from kindergarten to high school. She later received her bachelor's degree from Harvard University, an MPhil from Oxford University after she was awarded the Marshall Scholarship, an M.A. from Courtauld Institute of Art, and her Ph.D. from Yale University. Her work has been supported by the Ford Foundation, the Beinecke Rare Book & Manuscript Library, the Hutchins Center for African and African American Research at Harvard University, the Gilder Lehrman Center for the Study of Slavery, Resistance & Abolition, and the Cullman Center for Scholars and Writers at the New York Public Library.

Research and writing
Lewis is the co-editor of an anthology on the work of Carrie Mae Weems (MIT Press), which received the 2021 Photography Network Book Prize, and her upcoming book, How Race Changed Sight in America, will be published by Harvard University Press in 2024. She is author of the Los Angeles Times bestseller, The Rise: Creativity, the Gift of Failure, and the Search for Mastery (Simon & Schuster), a layered, story-driven investigation of how innovation, discovery, and the creative process are all spurred on by advantages gleaned from improbable foundations. Called “lyrical and engaging” and “strikingly original” by The New York Times, The Rise has been translated into 7 languages to date.

Her essays on race, contemporary art and culture have been published in many journals as well as the New York Times, the New Yorker, Artforum, Art in America and in publications for the Smithsonian, the Museum of Modern Art, and Rizzoli.

Vision & Justice
Lewis is the founder of Vision & Justice, based on the topic of her core curriculum at Harvard, which "wrestles with the question of how the foundational right of representation in a democracy, the right to be recognized justly, has historically and is still urgently tied to the work of visual representation in the public realm."

Lewis was the guest editor for Aperture’s Summer 2016 “Vision & Justice” issue, which focuses on the role of photography in the African American experience. This issue received the 2017 Infinity Award for Critical Writing and Research from the International Center of Photography, and launched Vision & Justice.

She organized the Vision & Justice Convening in 2019, a two-day event that considered the role of the arts in understanding the nexus of art, race, and justice. The program was hosted by the Radcliffe Institute for Advanced Study and featured a range of dynamic speakers and events.

In 2021, Frieze New York paid tribute to Lewis and Vision & Justice, with over 50 galleries and institutions offering digital events, artworks, institutional contributions, and screenings that responded to the question: 'How are the arts responsible for disrupting, complicating, or shifting narratives of visual representation in the public realm?'

Career
Before joining the faculty at Harvard, she held curatorial positions at the Museum of Modern Art, New York and the Tate Modern, London. She also served as a Critic at Yale University School of Art.

She is a frequent speaker and has lectured at many universities and conferences such as TEDGlobal, SXSW, PopTech, ASCD and for a wide range of organizations from the Aspen Institute to the Getty to The Federal Reserve Bank.

She has served on President Obama's Arts Policy Committee and on the boards of the CUNY Graduate Center, the Brearley School, and the Andy Warhol Foundation of the Visual Arts. She is a board member of Creative Time, Thames & Hudson, Inc., and Harvard Design Press, and serves on the Yale University Honorary Degrees Committee.

Lewis became the inaugural recipient of the Freedom Scholar Award in 2019, presented by the Association for the Study of African American Life and History to honor her for her body of work and its "direct positive impact on the life of African-Americans."

She received the 2022 American Philosophical Association's Arthur Danto/American Society for Aesthetics Prize for the paper, "Groundwork: Race and Aesthetics in the Era of Stand Your Ground Law." It was published in Art Journal. The prize is awarded for "the best paper in the field of aesthetics, broadly understood."

In 2022, Lewis was named an Andrew Carnegie Fellow.

References

External links
 

Living people
Harvard University faculty
American art curators
American women curators
Harvard University alumni
Yale University alumni
Place of birth missing (living people)
Brearley School alumni
Alumni of the University of Oxford
American women academics
21st-century American women
1979 births